The 2019–20 Ivy League men's basketball season is the Ivy League's 66th season of basketball. Yale and Harvard are defending regular season champions. Yale defeated Harvard in the Ivy League tournament to each the conference's bid to the NCAA tournament last season.

The 2019-2020 Ivy League Tournament was scheduled to take place at Harvard University, March 13–15, 2020.

On March 10, 2020, the Ivy League announced that the 2020 Ivy League Tournament is cancelled due to the coronavirus. Yale was to represent the Ivy League in the 2020 NCAA Men's basketball tournament.

Coaches 

Notes:

 All records, appearances, titles, etc. are from time with current school only.
 Overall and Ivy records are from time at current school through the end of the 2018–19 season.

Players of the week

Conference matrix

Source

All-Conference teams and awards
On March 11, the Ivy League handed out its major awards.

References

 
Ivy League men's basketball season, 2019-20